Brzyskorzystewko  is a village in the administrative district of Gmina Żnin, within Żnin County, Kuyavian-Pomeranian Voivodeship, in north-central Poland. According to the 2006 census, the village has a population of 790.

References

Brzyskorzystewko